The Olongapo Caper  is an adventure story arc of the Philippine comic strip series Pugad Baboy, created by Pol Medina Jr. and originally published in the Philippine Daily Inquirer. This particular story arc lasts 49 strips long. In 1995, the story arc was reprinted in Pugad Baboy 6, the sixth book compilation of the comic strip series.

Synopsis
Bab and Joboy hie off to Olongapo City, Zambales where they meet Amerasian Philip West, a waiter in the bar where the pair were having drinks. After becoming the object of a racial slur by a fellow waiter, Philip quits his job and offers to act as Bab and Joboy's tour guide for free. He takes them swimming from the Paradise Resort to the White Rock Beach Hotel beaches where they spot a woman on a jet ski having mechanical problems. They attempt to aid the woman and while they are doing so, another lady on the beach hails Philip. Philip recognizes the woman to be his sister, Pinky. The woman on the jet ski introduces herself as Agnes, Pinky's friend. At this point an unidentified man offers Agnes to Philip for fifty dollars, mistaking him for a wealthy American tourist. Agnes implies that she and Pinky are in the same situation. Realizing his mistake, the pimp threatens Philip, aiming a spear gun at him. Bab and Joboy come to his rescue by scooping up a jellyfish and mashing the animal on the pimp's face. Stung by the jellyfish's tentacles, the pimp rushes for shore. Philip soon notices that Pinky is gone and Agnes explains that they were being held hostage by a prostitution syndicate operating in the city.

Bark Justice and Babman
The trio embark on a mission to rescue Pinky from the syndicate. Acting on a tip from Agnes that she was recruited by an unknown woman who took her to Arthur's Bar after a quarrel with her boyfriend, they stake out the place. Agnes soon recognizes the man her former pimp was talking to in the bar; it was Wendell, her erstwhile boyfriend. They conclude that Wendell was working for the syndicate all along, victimizing innocent women for the prostitution racket. Philip, Bab and Joboy then went to the  Regional Trial Court in Olongapo City and asked a judge for an arrest warrant for Wendell. The judge replied that there was no such thing as a warrant for a citizen's arrest. The trio leave the court, led by Bab, who had changed into his Babman persona (a spoof of Batman), determined to pursue the syndicate.

Unbeknownst to them, the judge they had seen was Polgas in the guise of Judge Tickolas Marshall (a spoof of Judge Nicholas Marshall of Dark Justice fame), who believed in "Bark Justice". Judge Marshall follows the trio's pursuit of the syndicate's van mounted on his motorcycle. Babman and his cohorts meanwhile, had taken the Fatmobile and were in hot pursuit. Gunfire from the van erupted, hitting the Volkswagen Beetle's gas tank. Babman and the rest managed to abandon the vehicle before it blew up. Wendell in the syndicate's van soon spots Judge Tickolas Marshall following them on his motorcycle, however, he missed the vigilante with every burst from his weapon. Judge Marshall soon heads off the van and leaps on top of the vehicle as the driver smashes into his motorcycle. Thinking that they had killed Judge Marshall, the gang heads for their hideout. Judge Marshall, safely on top of the van, leaves a trail for Philip, Bab and Joboy to follow by throwing lingerie he had taken from the suitcases atop the vehicle into the road behind.

G.I. Jones
The van headed for Cubi Point where it was driven into a waiting LCT on the beach. As the barge sailed off into Subic Bay, Judge Marshall got off the van and located the syndicate's armory, where he rigged up a surprise. He then proceeded to disable the guards in the barge one by one. He was however defeated when in the act of grabbing the last goon, he discovered that it was a woman. Being the perfect gentleman, the Judge was unable to strike and hesitated, allowing the woman to cover him with her weapon. Sounding the alarm, she brings the rest of the gang in, including their leader, Cassius "G.I." Jones, an African American member of the US Navy who deserted and organized a white slavery operation in the country.

Taking his jacket off, Judge Marshall tosses it into his jury-rigged surprise - a wire attached to a flare gun aimed at the armory. The activated flare ignites the syndicate's store of ammunition and explosives, affording Judge Marshall the diversion he needed to grab a weapon from one of the goons. The gang soon run out of bullets and Judge Marshall steps out of cover to arrest the syndicate members. Jones, however, orders Rosie to relieve the Judge of his weapon, knowing Judge Marshall's weakness. As Rosie was about to grab Marshall's weapon, Agnes makes an appearance and gives Rosie an uppercut. She does the same to Wendell. Agnes then explains to Judge Marshall that she had picked up Babman, Philip and Joboy after they abandoned the Fatmobile and had been following his trail of lingerie. Babman chooses that moment to leap into barge from its high slab sides. Unfortunately, his weight punches a hole right through the barge's hull. Water begins to fill the LCT. Judge Marshall tells Joboy to free the hostages and swim for shore, while he takes care of G.I. Jones. Philip, however, asks Judge Marshall to leave G.I. Jones to him. The two square off; G.I. Jones is bigger and stronger, but Philip's lethal combination of an African American and Filipino heritage allows him to subdue the US Navy deserter.

Judge Marshall tells Joboy and Philip to give everyone, including the syndicate members, the tires they had found inside the barge as life preservers. They would have found it difficult to save everyone if not for the timely arrival of a Marine launch that took them off the sea. Babman was in the boat and claimed to have swum all the way to the Spratly Islands in order to summon help.

Epilogue
G.I. Jones wakes and find himself tied up, surrounded by a people's court composed of parents of his victims convened by Judge Tickolas Marshall, who sentences him to "die in any way possible". Judge Marshall leaves as the mob began to menace Jones.

Philip receives a letter from his father in San Diego, inviting him over. He, however, decides to remain in the Philippines and plans to open a fitness gym where he would teach bodybuilding and boxing while his sister Pinky and Agnes would be aerobics instructors.

As Bab and Joboy make their way home from Olongapo aboard a bus, they had time to watch a news report on television recounting the downfall of G.I. Jones' syndicate and how Richard Gordon personally thanked them for leading the authorities to the syndicate's hideout, much to the wonder of two men Bab and Joboy had earlier been exchanging bragging blows with.

Trivia
 This is Babman's first appearance in the comic strip. He would make another appearance as the main character in Babman.
 When Philip explains that he is Amerasian, Bab misinterprets what he hears and thinks that the word refers to memory loss - amnesia.
 Bab actually loses his way when the trio dive off Paradise Resort - he ends up in the Spratly Islands. He repeats the performance again after holing Jones' LCT. The Marines take him back both times. However, one of the Marines insist that Bab be kept on a tighter leash since they were fed up with traveling the long distance to drop him off.
 Joboy, despite being a mechanic, knows nothing about how a jet ski functions. He speculates that "water may have gotten into the exhaust pipe" and attempts to push-start the stalled vehicle, telling Agnes to put the jet ski into "second gear and pop the clutch".
 Babman's "Fat-Signal" (a spoof of the Bat-Signal), is a peace symbol.
 Judge Tickolas Marshall's motto is a modification of the Dark Justice tagline, "Justice may be blind, but it can see in the dark.". His version is "Justice may be blind, but you can hear its bark."
 In response to a guard's password challenge, one of the bad guys in the van responds by singing the opening lines of the Imelda Papin ballad Isang Linggong Pag-ibig (Filipino, "A Week-long Love Affair").
 Pol Medina, Jr. makes a small mistake in this story arc, mis-labeling a flare gun as an "Avery Pistol". Flare guns are sometimes called "Very Pistols" after Edward Wilson Very, the gadget's inventor.
 Babman's line, "Have you ever danced with the devil... in the pale moonlight?" is borrowed from the 1989 Batman movie starring Michael Keaton. In a scene in the film, The Joker asks Bruce Wayne, "Tell me something, friend. Have you ever danced with the devil by the pale moonlight?".
 The fourth wall is broken once more as Judge Marshall talks Joboy and Philip out of letting the syndicate go down with the barge. There are "witnesses", he says, pointing at the reader, much to the duo's disappointment.
 Judge Marshall's unwillingness to hurt women is so far the only fear specific to a guise of Polgas. Polgas' general weakness of losing consciousness upon smelling a very foul odor, however, is not seen in Judge Marshall. Inversely, being a weakness specific to a guise, this weakness of gallantry is not seen yet in any of his other guises
 A minor arc preceding this one, in the same book, actually introduces Judge Marshall and discusses the kinds of sentences he lays out, probably as an appetizer to what kind of sentence he will eventually pass on to Jones.
 Despite being surrounded by an angry mob, the report later said that Jones escaped. He disappeared mysteriously.

Pugad Baboy